Salute is the second studio album released by British girl group Little Mix, on 8 November 2013 through Syco Music and Columbia Records. The album was mostly co-written by Little Mix, who stated that they were more involved in the development of this album compared to their debut album DNA. The album was preceded by the lead single "Move", an additional two singles "Little Me", and "Salute". It is also one of the two studio albums by the group to not feature any collaborations. 

Musically, the album sees Little Mix approach a more R&B-influenced sound while retaining their previous pop sound of their debut album. Salute also sees the quartet experiment more with 90s production sound with elements of hip-hop, teen-pop, and electronic dance music influences from the 2000s. The album contains lyrics focused around themes such as girl power, mental health, self-love, breakups, insecurity, and female empowerment.  

The album received generally positive reviews from critics, with some praising the group for their vocal harmonies. Commercially, Salute charted in nineteen music markets including reaching the top ten in the United Kingdom, Canada, Australia, Ireland, Scotland, and America. It was named as one of the best selling girl group albums in the UK, between 1994 and 2019.

Background
In an interview with Digital Spy in March 2013, Little Mix stated that they wanted their second album to have a more R&B sound. Group member Jesy Nelson added: "I personally want to put a lot more dancey stuff in there. As in, one of the songs that comes on in a club that makes you want to dance. Not that David Guetta sound, but more R&B – a bit like Eve and Gwen Stefani's "Let Me Blow Ya Mind". They also revealed that they would be starting to write material for the new album in the coming months. On 19 September Little Mix held a livestream to announce that they had finished recording their second album and it was going to be sent to be mixed. In the same livestream the girls announced that the first single "Move" would be premiered on radio on 23 September. They also sang an acapella of a song that would become "Little Me". On 4 October, Little Mix uploaded a video to their official YouTube page, announcing that their second album would be called Salute and would be available for pre-order on 7 October. The album was released in the UK on 11 November 2013 and released in the US on 4 February 2014.

Release and promotion
On 4 October 2013, Little Mix uploaded a video to their official YouTube page, announcing that their second album would be called Salute and would be available for pre-order on 7 October. The album was released on 11 November 2013 in the United Kingdom and was released in the United States 4 February 2014.

They sang "Move" for the first time live on 9 October at Big Gig 2013 for the Girlguiding organisation at Wembley Stadium. On 20 October Little Mix travelled to Australia, where they performed the singles "Wings", "DNA" and "Change Your Life" in an autograph signing. Little Mix performed "Move" on The X Factor Australia on 21 October 2013 and on the morning show Sunrise. They also sang it on The X Factor UK on 3 November 2013. They also performed it on The X Factor USA on 5 December 2013 and The Wendy Williams Show on 6 February 2014 as well as the Late Show with David Letterman. In December 2013 the group announced their second headlining concert tour, The Salute Tour, in support of the album.

The album's lead single, "Move", made its radio premiere on 23 September 2013 and was released on 3 November 2013. It charted at number three on the UK Singles Chart and number five on the Irish Singles Chart. Follow-up singles "Little Me" and the title track peaked at number 14 and 6 respectively in the UK. To promote the album, Little Mix embarked on their second headlining concert tour, entitled The Salute Tour between May and July 2014. A North American extension of this tour was scheduled for September and October, but was later cancelled due to the process of recording their next album.

On 21 August 2020, two new versions of the album were made available for download and streaming: an expanded edition of the album, which replaced the deluxe edition on Spotify and other streaming platforms, and one that only contained rarities and remixes of songs from the album.

Singles
On 23 September 2013, "Move" was premiered on BBC Radio One. For the single, Little Mix worked with Nathan Duvall, an up-and-coming R&B producer and Maegan Cottone the girls vocal coach. "Move" was released on 7 October in Australia and New Zealand. It was later released in the UK and Ireland on 3 November. It was sent to Mainstream Radio in the US on 18 February 2014 and reached number 38 on that chart. The song peaked at number three in the UK, number 5 in Ireland, number 19 in Japan and number 12 in New Zealand. The single also charted in Australia, Belgium, the Netherlands and Slovakia. Since then, "Move" has been certified gold in Australia and the UK for sales of 35,000 and 400,000 respectively.

"Little Me" was selected as the album's second single from the album. The song was co-written by TMS and Iain James, and produced by TMS. On 21 November 2013, Little Mix revealed via a YouTube video message that they had decided to release it as the second single because it held a lot of meaning to them and was written with their fans in mind. The song reached number fourteen in the UK, number three in Armenia, number fifteen in Iceland and number 16 in the Netherlands. It also charted in Australia, Ireland and Lebanon.

After releasing a cover of "Word Up!" as the charity single for Sport Relief in March 2014, Little Mix announced on 5 April 2014 that the title track "Salute" would be released as the album's third single. It was sent to UK radio on 28 April 2014. The official music video premiered on 2 May and received over one million views within 24 hours. It was released on 1 June. The song peaked at number 6 in the UK, number 5 in Scotland and number 12 in Ireland.

Promotional singles
The album was supported by five promotional singles. On 9 January 2014 the first two promotional singles released from Salute were "These Four Walls" which peaked at number fifty-seven on the UK Singles Charts, and "Nothing Feels Like You".
On 21 January 2014, the third, fourth, and fifth promotional singles released were "Towers", "Stand Down" and "See Me Now". Towers was included in the 2021, After We Fell movie soundtrack.

Critical reception

Salute received generally positive reviews from music critics. At Metacritic, which assigns a normalised rating out of 100 to reviews from mainstream critics, the album received an average score of 66, based on five reviews, which indicates "generally favourable reviews".

Lewis Corner of Digital Spy gave the album five out of five stars, noting an improvement over DNA (2012), stating, "the group have grown both musically and in confidence, paving the way for them to step out on to that world stage once again and really make their mark", while drawing comparisons to American girl group Destiny's Child. Jon OBrien of Yahoo! wrote that the album cemented Little Mix's status as music's premier girlband while characterising the album as "impressively mature yet still utterly infectious". Harriet Gibsone from The Guardian compared the album to pop music of the 1990s, awarding the album four out of five stars. New. Fresh. Hype. praises this album for the tight vocal harmonies and writing, scoring them 9. They also praised the production of this album, making them sound stronger and slicker. New. Fresh. Hype. scored the overall album 8.2. 
MSN gave the album five stars out of five recommending the tracks "Salute", "Move", "Boy", "Good Enough" and the rest of the album. Renowned for Sound commented that on the album, the group's vocals "are on top form and still gelling nicely together, even sounding better and more technical in many areas".

Spin included the album in their "20 Best Pop Albums of 2013" year-end list.

Commercial performance
In the UK, Salute charted at number four, becoming the group's second consecutive top five album in the country. It was named as one of the biggest selling albums in the UK between 2013 and 2014 and as of May 2022, it has sold over 429,000 copies. It has been ranked as one of the biggest-selling girl group albums between 1994 and 2019. 

On the US Billboard 200, Salute debut at number six, selling over 43,000 copies in its first week, becoming Little Mix second consecutive top ten studio album after DNA (2012). The album also reached the top ten on the Canadian, Australian, Irish and Scottish album charts. Salute reached the music markets in additional thirteen other countries including reaching the top twenty in Croatia, New Zealand, Norway, and Spain.

Track listing

Charts and certifications

Weekly charts

Year-end charts

Certifications

Release history

References

2013 albums
Syco Music albums
Little Mix albums
Albums produced by MNEK
Albums produced by Ash Howes
Albums produced by Richard Stannard (songwriter)
Albums produced by TMS (production team)